ISTM may refer to:

 Former name of ESIEE Management (Institut Supérieur de Technologie et de Management)
 International Society of Travel Medicine, an international organization on travel health initiative promotion